Kalisham Rural District is a rural district (dehestan) in Amarlu District, Rudbar County, Gilan Province, Iran. At the 2006 census, its population was 2,528, in 767 families. The rural district has 9 villages.

References 

Rural Districts of Gilan Province
Rudbar County